Ian Browne may refer to:

 Ian Browne (cyclist) (born 1931), Australian Olympic gold medal winner
 Ian Browne (musician) (born 1973), former drummer for the Matthew Good Band

See also
 Ian Brown (disambiguation)